Lydia Slubowski (January 8, 1931 – May 7, 2008), known professionally as Lydia Bruce, was an American actress. She is perhaps best known for playing Dr. Maggie Powers in the long-running soap opera television series The Doctors.

Bruce began her acting career in 1961, playing two roles on the television series Armstrong Circle Theatre and appearing in the broadway play A Call on Kuprin.

Bruce was cast as Dr. Maggie Powers on the soap opera The Doctors in 1968, playing the role until the show finished in 1982. She briefly appeared on Guiding Light, and appeared on Law & Order as Judge Martha Kershan in 1995.

Bruce died in May 2008 in Lancaster, Pennsylvania, at the age of 77.

Filmography

Television

References

External links 

1931 births
2008 deaths
20th-century American actresses
American television actresses
American soap opera actresses
People from Detroit
21st-century American women